Ballathie railway station served the hamlet of Ballathie, Perth and Kinross, Scotland from 1848 to 1868 on the Scottish Midland Junction Railway.

History 
The station opened on 2 August 1848 by the Scottish Midland Junction Railway. To the north was a siding, which was known as Innernytie siding, and to the west of this was a signal box. The station disappeared from Bradshaw in October 1849 but reappeared in February 1850. It closed fully in July 1868.

References

External links 

Disused railway stations in Perth and Kinross
Railway stations in Great Britain opened in 1848
Railway stations in Great Britain closed in 1868
1848 establishments in Scotland
1868 disestablishments in Scotland